Smiley’s People is a 1982 British six-part spy drama by the BBC. Directed by Simon Langton and produced by Jonathan Powell, it is the television adaptation of the 1979 spy novel Smiley's People by John le Carré, and a sequel to Tinker Tailor Soldier Spy (missing out the second book in the trilogy, The Honourable Schoolboy, which was not filmed for cost reasons). Starring Alec Guinness, Michael Byrne, Anthony Bate and Bernard Hepton, it was first shown in the United Kingdom from 20 September to 25 October 1982, and in the United States beginning on 25 October 1982.

Plot
George Smiley is called out of retirement when one of his former assets, an émigré general, is found murdered. In tidying up loose ends for the "Circus", his former employer, he discovers a clandestine operation run by his nemesis, Karla, for his own personal benefit. Smiley is able to use this irregularity against Karla, forcing him to defect to the West.

Cast

Alec Guinness as George Smiley
Eileen Atkins as Madame Ostrakova
Michael Byrne as Peter Guillam
Bernard Hepton as Toby Esterhase
Anthony Bate as Sir Oliver Lacon
Barry Foster as Sir Saul Enderby
Michael Lonsdale as Anton Grigoriev
Beryl Reid as Connie Sachs
Bill Paterson as Lauder Strickland
Siân Phillips as Ann Smiley
Mario Adorf as Claus Kretschmar
 Tessy Kuhls as Frau Kretzschmar
Patrick Stewart as Karla
Curd Jürgens as Gen. Vladimir
Vladek Sheybal as Otto Leipzig
Rosalie Crutchley as Mother Felicity
Maureen Lipman as Stella Craven
Dudley Sutton as Oleg Kirov
Michael Gough as Mikhel
Michael Elphick as Detective Chief Superintendent
Paul Herzberg as Villem Craven
Stephen Riddle as Nigel Mostyn
Tusse Silberg as Alexandra/Tatiana
Norma West as Hilary
Ingrid Pitt as Elvira
Lucy Fleming as Molly Meakin
Andrew Bradford as Ferguson
Joe Praml as Paul Skordeno
Alan Rickman as Mr Brownlow
Tanya Rees as Beckie Craven
Alex Jennings as PC Hall

Production
The series was produced in partnership with the BBC and Paramount Pictures with a budget of $3 million. Due to the success of Tinker, Tailor, Soldier, Spy, director John Irvin had begun making movies and was unavailable. Later in pre-production, Simon Langton replaced John MacKenzie, Irvin's initial successor as director of the series. According to Michael Jayston (who himself could not reprise his role from Tinker, Tailor, Solider, Spy for various reasons), this was at the behest of Guinness, who was unhappy with MacKenzie. During filming, Guinness was not satisfied with Langton either, writing; "I felt dubious about Simon's work... I greatly miss John Irvin's grip and inner tension." Arthur Hopcraft declined the offer to write the screenplay and was replaced by John Hopkins. Author le Carré was called in to help resolve technical difficulties within the script. In contrast to the public television broadcast of Tinker Tailor Soldier Spy, Smiley's People was telecast in the U.S. in November 1982 as an Operation Prime Time presentation on some 100 independent commercial stations across the country.

The bridge leading from East to West Berlin for the defection scene was found in the Midlands city of Nottingham. Other location shooting was done in Berne, Hamburg, Paris, and London.

Reception
The initial reviews were good, but the enthusiasm decreased as the series progressed. A contemporary review in The New York Times described the production as a "marvelously riveting television film" and referred to Guinness's performance as stunning and the supporting company as outstanding. The review summarized the series as "the best show you are likely to see on television for the time being." In a retrospective review, Neal Justin of the Star Tribune called Guinness's portrayal of Smiley as "a master class in subtle acting." Mark Lawson of The Guardian called the adaptation, "among the most beautiful and enduring achievements of TV drama."

Awards
In 1983 Smiley's People won four BAFTA awards, including Best Actor (for Alec Guinness) and Best Actress (for Beryl Reid), and was nominated for six others. The series also won a Peabody Award. In 2010, The Guardian ranked the series at number 17 in their list of "The Top 50 TV Dramas of All Time".

Commercial releases
Smiley's People was released on VHS in 1991 (BBCV 4606) and 1999 (BBCV 6767). It was released on Region 2 DVD in 2004 (BBCDVD 1183), and in 2011 bundled with Tinker Tailor Soldier Spy (BBCDVD 3535). A remastered Blu-ray edition was released in 2020 (BBCBD0502).

Patrick Gowers' soundtrack was released by BBC Records in 1982 (REP 439, vinyl and ZCH439, cassette), and re-released on blue vinyl (DEMREC710) and as MP3 in 2020 by Demon Records.

References

External links

 
 The New Yorker: "We Are All Smiley's People"

1982 British television series debuts
1982 British television series endings
1980s British drama television series
BAFTA winners (television series)
BBC television dramas
1980s British television miniseries
English-language television shows
Television shows set in England
Espionage television series
Television series about the Cold War
Films based on British novels
John le Carré
Peabody Award-winning television programs
Television shows based on British novels
Secret Intelligence Service in fiction